The 2001 French Formula Three Championship was the 34th running of the French Formula Three Championship. It began on 31 March at Nogaro and ended on 20 October at Magny-Cours after eleven races.

Ryo Fukuda of Saulnier Racing won races at Nogaro, Lédenon, Spa, Le Mans, and Val de Vienne Magny-Cours, and had another two podiums on his way to the championship title. He had only one rival who can contest with him and shared leftover wins. It was Tiago Monteiro, who won Nogaro, Croix-en-Ternois, and Albi races.

Teams and drivers
 All cars competed on Michelin tyres.

Race calendar and results

Standings
Points are awarded as follows:

References

External links
 Standings on Driver Database

Formula Three
French
French Formula Three Championship
French Formula 3